The Russian Census of 2010 was the second census of the Russian Federation population after the dissolution of the Soviet Union. Preparations for the census began in 2007 and it took place between October 14 and October 25.

The census
The census was originally scheduled for October 2010, before being rescheduled for late 2013, citing financial reasons, although it was also speculated that political motives were influential in the decision. However, in late 2009, Prime Minister Putin announced that the Government of Russia had allocated 10.5 billion rubles in order to conduct the census as originally scheduled (in October 2010).

Results 

The census recorded the population as 142.9 million, a decrease of 2.3 million (1.6%) since the 2002 census. The population is 73.7% urban (105.3 million) and 26.3% rural (37.5 million). The median age is 38 years. The ethnic composition is dominated by Russians (80.9% of the population).

See also
Demographics of Russia

References

External links

 Results of 2010 All-Russia population census
 Official website of the 2010 Census 

Censuses in Russia
Census
2010 censuses